

References 

Post
Thailand
Post-nominal letters